Guido Giannettini (August 22, 1930 – May 12, 2003) was an Italian secret agent.

Activism 
Guido Giannettini was born August 22, 1930 in Taranto. In 1954 he joined the student association Young Italy in Naples. He was active in the OAS support networks, and arrested in 1961 in Madrid along with Pierre Lagaillarde.

Giannettini wrote for the newspapers Il Roma and Il Secolo d'Italia, as well as L'Italiano, headed by Pino Romualdi (MSI). In 1963-64, he started to write in the Rivista Militare, a journal of the Italian military general staff, and participated in various NATO meetings.

Giannettini participated in a colloquium on "revolutionary warfare" on 3–5 May 1965 in Rome (Parco dei Principi hotel), which was organized by the Institute Alberto-Pollio, "quasi-exclusively financed by the SIFAR"  military intelligence agency. Giannettini presented there one of the main reports. According to René Monzat, "this colloquium provided the theoretical framework for the strategy of tension."

Following this colloquium, in which about 20 students participated (among them, Stefano Delle Chiaie and Mario Michele Merlino), Giannettini and other intervenants were hired by the Italian secret services. In April 1968, these students went on a trip to Greece of 60 students from the "League of Greek Fascist Students in Italy" and of 51 Italian neo-fascist students, organized by the Greek junta. According to Frédéric Laurent, author of L'Orchestre noir (p. 75), "more than half of the Italians (...) returned from Athens suddenly converted to Anarchism, Leftism, or to Communism, preferably Chinese".

In 1966, Giannettini published with Pino Rauti "Red Hands on the Armed Forces" (Le mani rosse sulle forze armate). In 1969, he participated in an Italian military delegation to West Germany, to prepare the purchase of Leopard tanks. According to the Swiss brochure made by friends of Giannettini, he was an important agent of the SIFAR and then of the SID ("Agent Z").

During the Parliamentary Commission on Terrorism headed by Senator Giovanni Pellegrino, the Italian Minister of Defense officially recognized before parliament that Giannettini had been on the Italian secret services' pay-roll. Giorgio Freda, who was acquitted in the trial concerning the 1969 bombings, gave public marks of trust to Giannettini.

According to the magistrate Guido Salvini, in charge of the investigations concerning the 1969 Piazza Fontana bombing, "Guido Giannettini had contacts with Yves Guérin-Sérac in Portugal ever since 1964"

References 

1930 births
2003 deaths